The Gare de Bernay is the train station for the town of Bernay, Eure. It was built by Chemins de Fer de l'Ouest in 1855. It is situated on the Mantes-la-Jolie–Cherbourg railway. The station was, like most stations on the line to Cherbourg, built by the line's first concessionary, the Compagnie du chemin de fer de Cherbourg.  The station is a traditional building, with the lower part built in granite with red brick walls, with stone doors and window entourages.

Trains to and from Bernay travel to Caen, Trouville-Deauville, Évreux-Normandie, Paris-Saint-Lazare and Rouen-Rive-Droite.

References

External links
 

Railway stations in Eure
Railway stations in France opened in 1855